The Stepford Cuckoos are a set of fictional mutants, psychically linked quintuplets (Celeste Cuckoo, Esme Cuckoo, Irma "Mindee" Cuckoo, Phoebe Cuckoo, and Sophie Cuckoo) appearing in American comic books published by Marvel Comics. The alphabetical order of the Cuckoos' first names corresponds with their ages, with Celeste being the firstborn and Sophie being the youngest. Originally calling themselves the Five-in-One, after the deaths of Esme and Sophie the remaining sisters were known as the Three-in-One. They are commonly associated with the Xavier Institute for Higher Learning and successor mutant schools.

Their name "Stepford Cuckoos" is a reference to the books The Stepford Wives and The Midwich Cuckoos. The Stepford Cuckoos made their live action debut as the Frost Sisters; Esme, Sophie, and Phoebe in the television series The Gifted, portrayed by Skyler Samuels.

Publication history

First appearing in New X-Men, vol. 1 #118, they were created by Grant Morrison. Their origin, as the artificially created "daughters" of Emma Frost, is revealed in X-Men: Phoenix – Warsong.

Esme and Sophie were among the feature characters in the 2011 two-issue limited series Chaos War: X-Men.

Fictional character biographies

Origins
As revealed in the first issue of X-Men: Phoenix – Warsong, the sisters are grown from ova cells harvested from telepath Emma Frost while she lay comatose after a Sentinel attack that killed her students, the original Hellions, and are only five of many cloned daughters. They state that over a thousand eggs were stolen from Emma's ovaries during her coma, and the remaining hundreds (if not thousands) of clones reside within incubation chambers inside a hidden underground laboratory at The World, a complex housing the Weapon Plus (living beings designed to serve as weapons) program. They were created by Dr. John Sublime to be powerful weapons able to kill every mutant by combining their telepathic abilities. The Cuckoos were designated Weapon XIV.

They were first introduced as the protégés and favorites of Emma Frost, and were unaware of their true purpose. A telepathic block was used to mask their placement in the school, causing anyone who questioned their origins to lose their train of thought. They, along with student Quentin Quire, were noted as the strongest telepaths among the new students at the Xavier Institute of Higher Learning. Although Quire and the Stepford Cuckoos were rivals, Quire had a crush on Sophie. Sophie and the other Cuckoos considered him to be disgusting and rejected him completely.

Partly as an expression of adolescent rebellion, partly under the influence of a mutant drug called Kick, and partly out of a desire to impress Sophie, Quire incited a student riot at the Xavier Institute for Higher Learning. Sophie died stopping Quire, overexerting herself after using the same drug to boost her powers. The Stepford Cuckoos held Frost to be partially responsible for Sophie's death - with Frost having "inspired her to heroism" - and disassociated themselves from her at that time. With the death of Sophie, the Five-in-One became the Four-in-One. Wary of having a part of themselves missing, they tested to see if their powers still functioned well by contacting Jean Grey telepathically and informing her that Emma Frost was attempting to conduct an affair with her husband, Scott Summers.

Secretly, Esme Cuckoo had been collaborating with X-Man Xorn, then disguised as Magneto. Taking control of the Cuckoos' group mind, she telepathically forced Angel Salvadore to attack Emma Frost, completely shattering her diamond body into fragments. Jean Grey managed to telekinetically reassemble Frost and return her to life, whereupon Emma revealed Esme's involvement in the attack. Esme then abandoned her sisters to join Magneto's new Brotherhood of Mutants. Later, losing faith in Xorn, the Brotherhood turned on him and Esme, who attacked him, angry that Xorn did not return her affections. Xorn then killed Esme, and she died in Emma's arms, stating with her dying breath that she never wanted to end up like Emma.

Corsairs
Soon afterwards, the institute is rebuilt, with Emma Frost and Cyclops as headmasters and leaders of the X-Men. Frost and Summers divided the older students into several six-person training squads, each taught by a staff member. The remaining three Cuckoos, now calling themselves the "Three-in-One," were assigned to the Corsairs squad, advised by Cyclops. The three girls were the co-leaders of the squad.

In X-Men: Phoenix Endsong (March–June 2005), the cosmic entity known as the Phoenix Force came back to Earth seeking to inhabit the body of Jean Grey. Quentin Quire, still in love with Sophie, sensed the Phoenix and exhumed Sophie's body. He sought the Phoenix, which resurrected Sophie, but she promptly chooses to die again rather than be with him. The X-Men defeat the Phoenix,  though a shard of it in firefly form locates Celeste.

Weapon Plus and Phoenix—Warsong
In New X-Men, vol. 1 #154 (May 2004), the Stepford Cuckoos are identified as Weapon XIV (each girl being units 1 to 5, ordered alphabetically by their first names), the living weapon code between Weapon XIII (Fantomex) and Weapon XV (Ultimaton).

Manipulated by both the shard of the Phoenix and Dr. John Sublime, the Cuckoos reanimate Esme and Sophie as corpses and return to the World. At the World, they are greeted by a computer image of Sublime and learn of their thousands of cloned siblings. Their true purpose was to collect data on the X-Men and transmit it to the other clones through shared nanotechnology in their bodies. It is revealed that the Phoenix fragment has manifested in order to destroy the Cuckoos and all of their clones to prevent them from being activated as a weapon and killing all mutants. The Phoenix manifests most strongly through Celeste, using her as its avatar, but is then diffused according to Sublime's plans among each of the cloned telepaths, boosting their powers. The Cuckoos then learn that they also shared Emma's ability to turn into a diamond form. Now referring to themselves as the Thousand-in-One and under Sublime's control, the cosmically empowered psychics proceed to enact their programmed destiny of mutant destruction. Celeste, at Emma's behest, accepts her role as a Phoenix host and wrestles control of the Phoenix, freeing the clones from Sublime's control for the first time. However, the Phoenix goes on to destroy the thousand clones, despite their newfound freedom and desire to experience life, by shattering their newly manifested diamond forms as well as Esme and Sophie. Disgusted by the destruction, Celeste casts the entity out of her body. However, it refuses to depart causing Celeste to reabsorb it into her own and Mindee and Phoebe's diamond hearts to end the Phoenix's destruction. Unlike Emma's diamond composition, which contains a flaw, the Cuckoo's hearts are flawless diamond. As such, the Phoenix fragment is literally sealed within their hearts. The price the sisters must pay for this is that they can never again feel emotion, leaving them more detached from others than they were before.

Post-Civil War
The Stepford Cuckoos were considered as "potential recruits" for the Initiative program. The girls were next seen helping Elixir master medical and anatomical knowledge via Beast's brain. They are soon after teleported to Limbo with the other students and captured by Belasco, who has helmets placed on them to keep them asleep to prevent them from using their powers. They were freed by a newly revived X-23 and turn the tide of the battle against Belasco. When the Hulk attacks Xavier, the Astonishing X-Men, and the New X-Men, the Stepford Cuckoos contact several other X-teams such as Excalibur, the Uncanny X-team, and X-Factor to get their help. They then help Prodigy access all his forgotten knowledge and abilities to compensate for his power loss as thanks for saving them when anti-mutant terrorists known as the Purifiers attacked the school.

Messiah Complex

The Cuckoos use Cerebro to track down Cable, who has the missing mutant baby for whom the X-Men are looking.

When the X-Men arrive at the location indicated by the Cuckoos, the baby had already been stolen by the Marauders. The Cuckoos are unable to relocate the baby telepathically, so Emma Frost orders them to focus on finding the Marauders who kidnapped it.

Manifest Destiny
Following the events of the Messiah Complex, the Cuckoos rejoin the X-Men in their new home of San Francisco, along with many of their former classmates. The girls later agree to help erase Josh Foley's memory of his work with the newly reformed X-Force team, so as to help the team maintain a sense of a secrecy from the main X-Men team. They agree to keep the team a secret, primarily out of loyalty to Cyclops. The girls have recently begun to dress more individually than before, no longer wearing matching outfits. Each of them also have different hairstyles, with only one of the Cuckoos keeping their prior hairstyle.

Secret Invasion

The Cuckoos help oppose Skrull invaders in San Francisco. When the Skrulls place a blockade on all telepathic communication, they channel their telepathy through Cerebra into Emma as she attempts to find the psychic blockade and destroy it. Emma's psyche is briefly disconnected from her body and as she fights the Skrull psychics, the Cuckoos, on orders from Cyclops, use their telepathy to keep Emma's autonomic functions going. Afterward, the Cuckoos appear as supporting characters in Uncanny X-Men.

Nation X
During a pitched battle between the X-Men and a pack of genetically altered versions of Predator X, the Phoenix fragments that were contained in the Cuckoos' diamond hearts leave them and depart into space for reasons unknown. During their time on Utopia, the Cuckoos begin to experience boredom and start sneaking off the island to buy DVDs of horror films. Influenced by the movies, the girls start mentally torturing their classmates using scenarios from The Twilight Zone and Ring among others. After Emma discovers this, she reveals that as a child she was a fan of the film Clash of the Titans, and that she occasionally daydreams of being in the movie herself. Realizing that she always loved teaching, Emma decides to make the Cuckoos into teachers for the island's school, thus giving them something to do with their time.

Chaos War
During the "Chaos War" storyline, Esme and Sophie are among the fallen X-Men members who return from the dead after what happened to the death realms. Sophie confronted Esme about her death with little resolution. During this time, Sophie befriended Thunderbird. While searching for answers among the remains of the Xavier Institute, the former X-Men were attacked by Carrion Crow: Eater of the Dead. Esme later sacrificed herself to save her sister from Carrion Crow. In the aftermath of the defeat of the Chaos King, Sophie is returned to the afterlife after reality is restored by Hercules. Thunderbird even commented that the next time that he is resurrected, it would be with Sophie.

Regenesis
After "Schism" Phoebe wanted to go to Westchester while Irma wanted to stay at Utopia, leaving the deciding vote to Celeste, who chose Utopia after learning that Quentin Quire was going to be at Westchester. Following the death of Charles Xavier and the appearance in the present day of the original five X-Men, the Cuckoos decide to join Cyclops's new iteration of the Xavier School.

Wolverine and the X-Men
During AvX the Stepford Cuckoos came to stay at the Jean Grey School. When Cyclops and his team came to confront Beast about bringing the original X-Men forward in time the Cuckoos left with them. When Teen Angel tried to leave Wolverine's school Teen Jean tried to force him to stay against his will. As punishment the Cuckoos forced Teen Jean into submission and only relented after Teen Jean had learned her "lesson." Angel then left to join Cyclops's team much to Teen Jean's grief since they were supposed to stay together.

Uncanny X-Men
After joining the team and getting settled in, Irma changes her hair style, much to Celeste's horror, though Emma approves and encourages Irma and her sisters to be their own people. Irma spots Triage and both seem to have an attraction to each other, but neither acts on it. They later participate as members of Cyclops's team during the Battle of the Atom.

When the time-displaced team of the original X-Men join Cyclops's team, Celeste becomes hostile towards the time-displaced teenage Jean Grey. During an excursion to a mall, Jean reveals to Celeste that Irma and Phoebe do not have a problem with her like Celeste does. The group encounters a member of the Inhumans, and the Cuckoos as well as Jean Grey are knocked out.

X-23
The remaining Cuckoos, feeling empty without their sisters, opted to seek out and employ a genetic regeneration specialist who did work at The Facility behind Laura Kinney's genesis. Through the mental manipulation of one Dr. Helen Marks by Phoebe, Irma and Celeste, the professor was able to fabricate clone bodies from D.N.A templates identical to the trio's fallen siblings, whilst the Cuckoo's beckoned the wayward consciousnesses of Sophie and Esme from the afterlife to inhabit them. The process was flawed however, as the xeroxed bodies rejected the psychic imprint of their mortal hosts; causing their bodies to deteriorate at an accelerated pace.

In order to properly preserve their dying matriarchs, Esme — carrying an ailing Sophie by her side — demanded they go through with an alternative plan: securing the healthy body of an X-23 program subject, Gabby.

In reality however, Esme had been manipulating both her sisters and their engineering assistants from behind closed doors the entire time. Subtly pushing her three living relatives into mind controlling several biophysical manipulation experts to giving herself a new lease on life, as well as having Helen create a cellular degeneration compound with which she used to murder her sister Sophie behind everyone's backs again.  All while pleading that the former head of the 5-in-one died over night. A chase would ensue after the three-in-one managed to send out a false text to call Gabby to their location at an abandoned church, wherein they put Laura under psychic hallucination as the three made off with their prize.

X-23 would soon follow in hot pursuit but was bamboozled again into chasing the wrong mini van by the Cuckoos. The three of them would utilize a mental transference device crafted by Dr. Marks to extrapolate and imprint psi-signatures onto healthy bodies with vast recuperative abilities to siphon Esme's mind from her faulty body over to Gabby's healthier vessel.

But the process would be interrupted by Laura, who was alerted to their location via GPS tracker activated by her foster sister right as the experiment commenced. In the aftermath of which Esme's persona would successfully carry over onto Gabby's being while Laura herself had been blasted out of the barn area where the procedure was underway. As a consequence of trying to intercept the occurrence, X-23 ended up with the consciousness of Sophie Cuckoo set within her mind.

As Mindee was sent out to find whether or not Laura had perished in the blast. The newly rejuvenated Gabby/Esme began discussing her plan of ascendance to her two remaining sisters Phoebe and Celeste. Meanwhile, the former leader of the quintumvirate, Sophie, would communicate with Laura in the mental plane, explaining to her and Cuckoo family's life story just as Irma would run into Laura thinking it was Sophie in the physical world. After some harsh coercion by the former and more nuanced explanations by her deceased sibling, Mindee is appalled at the discovery Esme had schemed, lied and killed her only kin once more after returning from beyond the grave. Reluctantly offering her assistance to the Laura/Sophie amalgam in their efforts to stop the current three-in-one from reaching Cerebro before Esme can gain control of it. As Esme and the other Cuckoo's make their way to the Xavier Institute, they are intercepted by a bazooka packing Beast riding a helicopter while their leader rants about how the X-Men wasted their time and their lives protecting worthless humans. Esme is dismayed to discover the adversary before them was merely an illusion conjured up by Sophie waiting at the school of gifted youngsters. Sophie went onto reveal the depth and extent of Esme's betrayal to her other siblings, when the both of them questioned why she would do such a thing after all they went through just to bring them back. Esme coldly rebuts such claims while admitting she compelled their actions thus far from start to finish. Retorting that the Cuckoos were little more than mindless drones without her to think their thoughts for them, Esme then stabbed Phoebe with Gabby's bone claw. While Laura got into a brutal fight with Esme with Sophie keeping their shared mind free of her psychotic sister's mental influence, Irma managed to make her way to Cerebro to galvanize the other Cuckoo's psychic powers through herself and Laura. All these efforts were towards the purpose of excising their deranged number from Gabby's body, where afterwards the equally disembodied Sophie would bury her twisted psyche so deep she would never resurface again. In the aftermath, the remaining Cuckoo clones would disappear for a time. Laura would hear that they're squatting in Paris, something she knows that they know that Sophie would've enjoyed.

House of X
Professor Xavier, now simply called X, calls upon the Five to bring both Sophie and Esme back to life. The once bitter enemies acted as tour guides to a group of government officials while showing off the new Jerusalem Habitat created by Krakoa.

During the "Empyre" storyline, the Stepford Cuckoos are among the psychic mutants that are summoned to Genosha. They are among those who witness Magik's fight with the Cotatinaught.

Powers and abilities
The Cuckoos share a telepathic hive mind. Powerful telepaths individually, their combined power is even greater than its sum. These powers allow them the psychic standards of broadcasting/receiving thoughts, mind control, planting illusions, force blasts of pure psionic energy, astral projection, etc. Their gestalt mind allows them to communicate with one another instantaneously, though the strength of their gestalt depends on their proximity to one another; the further they are from one another, the weaker their ability to connect.

Though they most often function and act as one unit, they are indeed capable of thinking and operating individually. When all five sisters were alive, Sophie was the dominant consciousness and often commanded the Cuckoos. However, as implied by Esme's actions, it is possible for another one of the Cuckoos to wrest control of the gestalt and perhaps even use the powers of all sisters without the consent and knowledge of the others. With the loss of Sophie and Esme, The Cuckoos are not as strong as they were with five.

Like their mother, Emma Frost, each Cuckoo sister also possesses the ability to transform into an organic diamond body, and as such gains invulnerability, durability, and super strength. Unlike Frost, however, their diamond forms are flawless; such that nothing can enter or escape. They demonstrate this ability by sealing the splintered fragment of the Phoenix Force inside their hearts by permanently changing their hearts to diamond, in the process sacrificing their ability to ever feel genuine emotions again. The Phoenix Force eventually manages to escape, potentially allowing the sisters to regain their emotions. During the Warsong series, the Cuckoos gained the power of flight and pyrokinesis, presumably from Phoenix-induced telekinesis.

Additionally, the Cuckoos have demonstrated telekinesis.

The power level of the Cuckoos, in all of their incarnations, have been reported by many of the staff at Xavier's School to be extremely impressive and strong.

Personalities

Sophie Cuckoo
Sophie Cuckoo's personality is explored just before her death. She was stated as always being the dominant mind amongst her sisters. When Quentin Quire started a riot on the Xavier Campus, Sophie was "inspired to heroism" and used Kick to strengthen her powers and fight him. The strain killed Sophie, though it was secretly Esme's psychic influence that ultimately pushed her toward death. She has since been portrayed in other realities as the most free-thinking of the Cuckoos.

Down the line of publishing, Sophie shows a more maternal and chivalrous expression of character towards her siblings. Even towards Esme whom had betrayed and killed her twice. Showing she felt extreme amounts of guilt over her siblings actions which nearly cost Laura her own sister due to the deranged Cuckoo's machinations. Sophie is also revealed to be incredibly insightful to the underlying character ticks of her sisters, having guessed Esme hated being a clone; but failed to see her growing to hate her other siblings for which over time as well. Accurately surmising that Esme's psychotic tendencies come from extreme self hatred, in part of feeling like she's less of a person due to being a counterfeit person.

Phoebe Cuckoo
Phoebe Cuckoo demonstrated a power-hungry personality during the events of Warsong. In contrast to Celeste, who feared the consuming power of the Phoenix, Phoebe desired power out of the sheer affinity for wielding it. She readily embraced the Phoenix and enjoyed the destructive power it gave her.

Irma "Mindee" Cuckoo
Mindee Cuckoo was the next Cuckoo to be written with a distinct personality. She had a relationship with another student, Germaine, who was killed by an anti-mutant mob when the students were trapped in a building in the aftermath of Xorn's destruction of Manhattan. She then had a combative relationship with Jay Guthrie who was always interrupting her while she played the piano. She later helped Gambit during Exodus's Brotherhood's attack on the school. Her real first name is "Irma".

Irma has now dyed her hair and cut it short; she is now a brunette. Triage is attracted to her and the feeling might be mutual.

Celeste Cuckoo
During the events of Warsong, Celeste Cuckoo expressed fears of losing touch with her sisters, changing personalities, and wielding the Phoenix Force. According to Emma, she is the tattletale of the group. She eventually accepted her powers, killing the Thousand-in-One clones and her resurrected sisters per the cosmic judgment of Phoenix. Disgusted by the destruction the Phoenix caused, she tried to expel the Phoenix fragment from her body, but was instead forced to seal it inside Mindee's, Phoebe's, and her own diamond hearts. She is portrayed as the most compassionate of all the Cuckoos.

Upon meeting a teenage Jean Grey who was brought to the present by Beast, Celeste takes an instant dislike towards her and they are constantly bickering. When Irma decides to change her hair style and act more like an individual, Celeste is horrified at the thought of losing her connection to her sister. Much to her despair, Emma welcomes the sisters' growing individuality. Celeste also finds that her sisters both have little problem with Jean, furthering their divide.

Esme Cuckoo

Esme Cuckoo was the first to split from her sisters, falling in love with Shi'ar-soldier Stuff who disguised itself as a student. She soon attempts to murder Frost, and was later revealed to be the one responsible for the events that killed Sophie. Wanting to seize control of the Cuckoos but encountering resistance from Sophie, Esme used the drug Kick on herself to augment her own psychic powers and take control of the Stepford Cuckoos' group mind. Esme manipulated her sister Sophie into also using the drug Kick in order to overexert her telepathic powers to the point of death. Esme returned in the Planet X storyline, in which it was revealed that Esme had been working for Xorn the entire time, and that she had developed a crush on him. However, Esme turned on him and tried to destroy his mind after he rejected her affections. Xorn, hopped up on the Sublime contrived drug Hypercortisone D at the time, angrily killed her by smashing her metal earrings through her skull. She dies in Emma's arms, who tells Esme that out of all the Cuckoos, she was most proud of her. In later publishing Esme shows just how cruel, deceitful, power hungry and megalomaniac she can be; the fourth volume of X-23 would reveal the true magnitude of her truly murderous nature; manipulating her living siblings from beyond the grave, murdering and injuring them in order to achieve a desirable outcome for herself and reveling in the newfound invincibility that came with a Wolverine-lite body.

Conceptual changes
Originally, the first letter of each of the Cuckoo's names was supposed to spell out the word "spice" when put in proper sequence, Sophie, Phoebe, Irma,  Celeste and Esme, a reference to the British pop group, the Spice Girls. However, Grant Morrison never mentioned the name of the fifth Cuckoo (the one whose name was supposed to start with "I") during his run on New X-Men, and it was only later on that this fifth Cuckoo was named "Mindee" by Chuck Austen, who was unaware of Morrison's Easter egg. However, writer Matt Fraction later rectified this, stating that Mindee's real first name was Irma, thus restoring the original acronym.

They were first called the Stepford Cuckoos in New X-Men, vol. 1 #123 (April 2002), which was also the first issue in which Esme was named. Sophie, Phoebe, Celeste, and Mindee were named in New X-Men, vol. 1 #134 (January 2003), New X-Men, vol. 1 #149 (January 2004), New X-Men, vol. 1 #153 (April 2004), and New X-Men, vol. 1 #156 (June 2004), respectively. In the New X-Men: Academy X Yearbook, their last name was confirmed as "Cuckoo" and their codename as the "Three-in-One".

Reception
 In 2014, Entertainment Weekly ranked The Stepford Cuckoos 28th in their "Let's rank every X-Man ever" list.

Other versions

Age of X
In the "Age of X" reality, the Stepford Cuckoos are shown as inmates of Fortress X's X-Brig.

Exiles
In a reality shown in Exiles, where after the Hulk was jettisoned into space and discovered by Annihilus, killing him and taking the Annihilation Wave to Earth, Sophie, Esme and Mindee appear as some of the few remaining superhumans. Sophie has detached herself from the two remaining Cuckoos and is dating Quentin Quire, while Esme and Mindee remain like their original depictions in the main Marvel Universe. Sophie's mental abilities have also increased, and she has recurring dreams of future events to come.

Here Comes Tomorrow
In the "Here Comes Tomorrow" timeline, 150 years from now, Celeste, Mindee and Phoebe are members of the X-Men and operators of Cerebra, having merged with the machine, and calling themselves the "Three-in-One." Their psychic powers have also been amplified, allowing them to see the future. Despite the long time that has passed, they appear to be in their early twenties. With the release of the Warsong miniseries this can be attributed to the nanites in their bodies and their origins as Weapon XIV.

House of M

In House of M, the quintuplets were part of the New Mutant Leadership Program at the United Nations. From the five, Sophie appeared to be the one with the stronger personality. Sophie joined Prodigy, Surge and the rest of the New Mutants on their trip to Japan to find Seiji Ashida, while Celeste, Esme, Mindee, and Phoebe remained in New York, though they agreed to maintain the secret. Sophie was later killed in Japan by anti-mutant terrorists.

X-Men: The End

In the alternate future depicted in X-Men: The End, Celeste, Mindee, and Phoebe have each developed their own look and now call themselves "the Spikes." Phoebe has long, brown hair, Mindee has long, blond hair, and Celeste has short, black hair.

In other media

Television

 The Stepford Cuckoos appear in the Wolverine and the X-Men three-part episode "Foresight", voiced by Tara Strong. This version of the sisters are members of the Inner Circle. The group attempts to transfer the Phoenix Force from Jean Grey to the Cuckoos, but it proves too powerful for the sisters to control.
 The Stepford Cuckoos, renamed "Frost sisters", appear in The Gifted, portrayed by Skyler Samuels. This version of the sisters are members of the Hellfire Club who were created in a lab. While mounting an escape attempt, Celeste and Mindee died, while Sophie and Phoebe were captured by Sentinel Services until Esme eventually frees them in the present.

Film
Three identical blonde girls make a background appearance in X-Men: The Last Stand as students of Xavier's School for Gifted Youngsters. Co-writer Zak Penn confirmed in an online chat that they were the Stepford Cuckoos / Three-in-One.

Video games
The Stepford Cuckoos appear in X-Men Legends II: Rise of Apocalypse, voiced by Jennifer Hale. This version of the sisters are associates of Apocalypse and Holocaust, the latter of whom serves as their bodyguard.

References

External links
 Stepford Cuckoos at Marvel.com
 Stepford Cuckoos on MarvelDatabase

Characters created by Ethan Van Sciver
Characters created by Grant Morrison
Clone characters in comics
Comics characters introduced in 2001
Fictional avatars
Fictional collective consciousnesses
Fictional quintets
Marvel Comics characters who have mental powers
Marvel Comics characters with superhuman strength
Marvel Comics female superheroes
Marvel Comics mutants
Marvel Comics telekinetics
Marvel Comics telepaths
X-Men supporting characters